Akçadağ is a district of Malatya Province of Turkey. The mayor is Ali Kazgan.

On 24 Jan 2020 the town was impacted by a magnitude 6.7 earthquake.

Administration 
The District governor is Serdar Demirhan and the towns mayor is Ali Kazgan an Independent.

Geography 
Akçadağ is at an Altitude of 1,050 m (3,440 ft) above sea level and the district is considered mountainous, and the population is 2016 was 26.561.

See also
Kürecik Radar Station, a NATO early-warning missile defense radar situated at Çat Tepe in Kürecik.

References

External links
Akcadağ Belediyesi

 
Populated places in Malatya Province